Mečys Laurinkus (born 22 May 1951 in Klaipėda) is a Lithuanian politician. In 1990, he was among those who signed the Act of the Re-Establishment of the State of Lithuania.

References
Biography 

Members of the Seimas
1951 births
Living people
Politicians from Klaipėda
Vilnius University alumni
20th-century Lithuanian politicians